William Matheny may refer to:
 William A. Matheny (1902–1973), American pilot
 William Matheny (musician), American singer-songwriter